Yevhen Hekht (born 17 July 1966) is a Ukrainian sports shooter. He competed in the men's 10 metre running target event at the 1996 Summer Olympics.

References

1966 births
Living people
Ukrainian male sport shooters
Olympic shooters of Ukraine
Shooters at the 1996 Summer Olympics
Place of birth missing (living people)